Pseudoalteromonas citrea is a yellow-pigmented marine bacterium that is antibiotic-producing and was isolated from Mediterranean waters off Nice. Originally named Alteromonas citrea, nearly two decades later it was reclassified as part of the Genus Pseudoalteromonas.

References

External links

Type strain of Pseudoalteromonas citrea at BacDive -  the Bacterial Diversity Metadatabase

Alteromonadales
Bacteria described in 1977